The Distinguished Aviation Cross is a military decoration of the Armed Forces of the Philippines.  It is presented for heroism or achievement during aerial operations.

Criteria
The cross is awarded to personnel of the Armed Forces of the Philippines who are serving with the Philippine Air Force or with the air components of the Philippine Army or Philippine Navy.  The cross recognizes voluntary acts in the presence of significant danger, which go above and beyond the call of duty.  The accomplishment must be of an exceptional and outstanding nature.  It is awarded for "...distinguished heroism or extraordinary achievement while participating in aerial flight.

Appearance
The medal is made of gold-colored metal; it is diamond-shaped.  On the diamond is a Maltese cross with a golden sun in the center.  Rays from the sun project between the arms of the cross. Superimposed over the sun is a four-bladed propeller, the tips of each blade extending past the ends of the arms of the cross.

The cross is suspended from a blue ribbon with white edges.  It has a red central striped edged in gold.

See also
 Awards and decorations of the Armed Forces of the Philippines

References

Citations

Bibliography
 The AFP Adjutant General, AFP Awards and Decorations Handbook, 1995, 1997, OTAG.

Military awards and decorations of the Philippines